The Kerala Sahitya Akademi Award for Poetry is an award given every year by the Kerala Sahitya Akademi (Kerala Literary Academy) to Malayalam writers for writing poetry of literary merit. It is one of the twelve categories of the Kerala Sahitya Akademi Award.

Awardees

References

Awards established in 1959
Kerala Sahitya Akademi Awards
Malayalam literary awards
Poetry awards
1959 establishments in Kerala